

This is a list of the National Register of Historic Places listings in Monroe County, Michigan.

This is intended to be a complete list of the properties and districts on the National Register of Historic Places in Monroe County, Michigan, United States.  The locations of National Register properties and districts, for which the latitude and longitude coordinates are included below, may be seen in an online map.

There are 19 individual listings on the National Register in the county: nine properties, five historic districts, and one bridge. These listings include a lighthouse, statue, four houses, trading post, former factory, battlefield (Battle of Frenchtown), and six historic districts — one of which is an undeveloped archeological district. Eleven of the listings are located within the county's largest city, Monroe. The oldest of all properties listed is the Navarre-Anderson Trading Post, which was first built in 1789.

Current listings

|}

Former listings

|}

See also

 List of Michigan State Historic Sites in Monroe County, Michigan
 List of National Historic Landmarks in Michigan
 National Register of Historic Places listings in Michigan
 Listings in neighboring counties: Lenawee, Lucas (OH), Washtenaw, Wayne

References

Monroe
 
Buildings and structures in Monroe County, Michigan